The Devil's Plaything is a 1973 horror film directed by Joseph W. Sarno. An international co-production of Sweden, Switzerland and West Germany, the film's uncut version, features more suggestively sexual scenes.

Plot
In a central European castle, two young girls are summoned to learn about a will making them heirs to the property, on condition that they stay there for a full year. They are received by the hostess, an austere-looking woman named Wanda, who organizes satanic lesbian rites at night that celebrate, in sex and sapphism, the vampire Varga. Coincidentally, on the same day an anthropologist studying local superstitions and her brother were victims of a road accident and asked for accommodation at the castle.

Wanda turns out to be the descendant of a vampire baroness, Varga, burned alive centuries ago by the villagers for vampirism. Through the lesbian priestess Wanda, Varga seeks revenge by eliminating the families of her torturers.

Cast

Critical response
Nick Schager of Slant Magazine gave the film two out of five stars, writing, "Neither scary nor sexy, The Devil’s Plaything at least affords ample opportunities to compare the differences between natural boobs and a set of early-generation silicon implants." Ed Hulse of the trade journal Video Business describes the film as "a key title in the history of erotic horror", and writes, "The attractive young leads aren't the surgically enhanced bottle-blondes we typically see these days in Hollywood-made offerings of this type, and their acting is more than equal to the limited demands the script makes of them."

References

External links 
 

1973 horror films
English-language German films
English-language Swedish films
English-language Swiss films
Erotic horror films
Films directed by Joseph W. Sarno
Films set in castles
Films set in Germany
Swedish horror films
Swiss horror films
German supernatural horror films
German vampire films
1970s English-language films
1970s German films
1970s Swedish films